Primitive is the second studio album by American heavy metal band Soulfly, released in 2000 through Roadrunner Records. As of 2002, Primitive has sold over 226,569 copies as reported by SoundScan.

Songs
The first track of Primitive is "Back to the Primitive", which plays berimbau to begin the song and the album. "Back to the Primitive" is one of three singles released from the album, others were "Son Song" and "Jumpdafuckup".

"Jumpdafuckup" features Corey Taylor of Slipknot and Stone Sour on vocals, as well as sludgy guitar riffs. "Mulambo" appears in the movie The Forsaken. "Terrorist" incorporates lyrics from songs recorded by other bands: "Inner Self" by Sepultura and "Criminally Insane" by Slayer. In addition, "Terrorist" features Slayer vocalist Tom Araya.

"Son Song" pays tribute both singers' fathers who died young. Sean Lennon's father, John Lennon, was shot, while Max's father was killed by a heart attack. Musically, "Son Song" has Alice in Chains-like grungy riffs and Layne Staley-like vocals by Lennon. The song appears on the Valentine OST, although it's not included in the film.

"In Memory of..." is unique for Soulfly in that it contains rap elements. "Soulfly II" is the sequel to the first eponymously titled song, which uses a large number of instruments, including Congo drums, piano, sitar, twang, and various wind instruments. Asha Rabouin makes her first Soulfly appearance on "Flyhigh", in which she sings lines like 'Just let my soul fly free'.

Reception

Rolling Stone (9/28/00, pp. 53–4) - 3.5 stars out of 5 - "Old-school...Primitive is deeper...in the sound of [ex-Sepultura frontman] Max Cavalera's lived-in growl, the churning effect of a 4-string guitar and his concerns."
Q magazine (11/00, pp. 114–6) - 3 stars out of 5 - "While [their] percussive, ethnic grooves certainly make an impact, it's only when Cavalera allows his formula to be altered by others that sparks truly fly."
Alternative Press (11/00, p. 128) - 3 out of 5 - "With pre-millennial speed metal rubbing elbows with hip-hop, excursions into ambient instrumentals and acerbic soul, and a host of guests...Primitive is certainly a record [with] breadth."
CMJ (8/28/00, p. 32) - "More relaxed than their debut, the low-end slaughterhouse riffs are still embellished with Cavalera's beloved tribal percussion...[It] locks its teeth into the jugular."
Melody Maker (10/10/00, p. 50) - 4 stars out of 5 - "The metal album of the year so far...An incendiary blend of nu metal, reggae and Brazilian rhythms."
NME (11/4/00, p. 46) - 7 out of 10 - "Draws on Max's political rage at colonial history and crimes of the conquistadors...the heavy metal Bob Marley."

Track listing

Personnel

Soulfly
Max Cavalera – vocals, rhythm guitar, berimbau (tracks 1, 6, 7, 12)
Mikey Doling – lead guitar
Marcello D. Rapp – bass, percussion, drums (track 11)
Joe Nunez – drums
Additional musicians
Grady Avenell – vocals (track 2)
Chino Moreno – vocals (track 2)
Corey Taylor – vocals (track 4)
Sean Lennon – vocals, guitar, piano, synthesizer &  producer (track 6)
Tom Araya – vocals (track 8)
Babatunde Rabouin – vocals (track 11)
Deonte Perry – vocals (track 11), additional drum programming (tracks 6, 11)
Justus Olbert – vocals (track 11)
Asha Rabouin – vocals (track 12)
Dayjah – vocals (track 16)
The Mulambo Tribe – backing vocals (track 5)
Zyon Cavalera – foosball sound (track 5)
Igor Cavalera Jr. - "tuuu tuu" sound (track 5)
Jose Navarro – feedback effect (track 8)
Larry McDonald – percussion (tracks 1–12, 15–16)
Meia Noite – percussion (tracks 1–12, 15–16)
Zak Sofaly – percussion (track 10)
Toby Wright – production, additional vocals (track 7), synth bass (track 9), clarinet & piano (track 10), keyboards (tracks 1–5, 7-16), drum programming (tracks 2–4, 6, 7, 11, 12)

Additional personnel
Max Cavalera – production
The Rootsman – remixing & additional production (tracks 15, 16)
Anders Dohn – production (tracks 13, 14)
Jacob Langkilde – engineering (tracks 13, 14)
Jan Sneum – executive production (tracks 13, 14)
George Marino – mastering
Andy Wallace – mixing
Glen La Ferman – photography
Monte Conner – A&R
Leo Zulueta – Soulfly logo
Gloria Cavalera – additional photography, management
Kevin Estrada – additional photography
Christina Newport – management
Oasis Management – management
Nesta Garrick – cover artwork, package design
Neville Garrick – cover artwork, package design
Lance Dean – additional and assistant engineering
John Watkinson Gray – assistant engineering
Steve Sisco – mix engineering

Chart positions

References

Soulfly albums
2000 albums
Roadrunner Records albums
Albums produced by Toby Wright
Albums produced by Max Cavalera